The Secretariat of the Pacific Regional Environment Programme (SPREP) is an intergovernmental organisation based in Apia, Samoa with more than 90 staff members. The organisation is held accountable by the governments and administrations of the Pacific region to ensure the protection and sustainable development of the region's natural resources. The organisation actively promotes the understanding of the connection between Pacific island people and their natural environment and the impact that these have on their sustenance and livelihoods. The organisation was established in 1982. Previously South Pacific Regional Environment Programme, the word "South" was replaced with "Secretariat" in 2004, in recognition of the members north of the equator. The French equivalent name is Programme régional océanien de l’environnement (PROE).

Members
SPREP Members comprise 21 Pacific island countries and territories, and five developed countries* with direct interests in the region:

Conventions
SPREP oversees the following agreements, conventions and protocols, each of which is enacted by International treaty:

Agreement establishing the South Pacific Regional Environment Programme Apia, 1993
 Convention on Conservation of Nature in the South Pacific (Apia Convention) 1976 (Suspended in 2006)
 Convention for the Protection of the Natural Resources and Environment of the South Pacific Region (Noumea Convention) 1986
 Protocol for the Prevention of Pollution of the South Pacific Region by Dumping (Dumping Protocol of the Noumea Convention) 1986
 Protocol concerning Co-operation in Combating Pollution Emergencies in the South Pacific Region (Emergencies Protocol of the Noumea Convention) 1986
 Convention to Ban the Importation into Forum Island Countries of Hazardous and Radioactive Wastes and to Control the Transboundary Movement and Management of Hazardous Wastes within the South Pacific Region (Waigani Convention) 1995

Governance
The SPREP Annual General Meeting is the main governance mechanism of the organisation. SPREP Members meet once every year to discuss the workplan and budget and other matters relating to administration and corporate affairs. The 25th SPREP Meeting was held in the Republic of the Marshall Islands in October 2014.

SPREP began life in the late 1970s as a joint initiative of SPC, SPEC, ESCAP and UNEP - eventually functioning as a component of UNEP's Regional Seas Programme. The Programme received further impetus as a result of the  1982 Conference on the Human Environment in the South Pacific. Following a period of expansion and long deliberations, SPREP left SPC in Nouméa in 1992 and relocated to Samoa. It achieved autonomy as an independent inter-governmental organisation with the signing of the Agreement Establishing SPREP in Apia on 16 June 1993.

SPREP (the  Secretariat) is the region’s key inter-governmental organisation for environment and sustainable development, and is one of several inter-governmental agencies comprising the Council of Regional Organisations in the Pacific (CROP). Under the Agreement Establishing SPREP, the purposes of SPREP are to promote cooperation in the South Pacific Region and to provide assistance in order to protect and improve the environment and to ensure sustainable development for present and future generations (Art.2). SPREP's vision is: the Pacific environment - sustaining our livelihoods and natural heritage in harmony with our cultures. SPREP also functions as the Secretariat of 2 (formerly 3) regional conventions: the Nouméa Convention, the Waigani Convention and the Apia Convention (suspended).

References

External links
 SPREP

International organizations based in Oceania
New Zealand–Pacific relations
Intergovernmental environmental organizations